Arnold Timothée Albert Francois Joseph de Lasaulx (21 January 1774 – 18 July 1863) was a Belgian politician who served as the first Mayor of Neutral Moresnet from 1817 until 1859. Having served for more than 41 years, he was Neutral Moresnet's longest-serving mayor, having served for nearly half of the territory's existence.

Life

Lasaulx was born at Castle Alensberg, the son of Pierre-Olivier-Albert-Georges-Joseph de Lasaulx and Marie-Anne-Emérantiane-Josèphe de Mylius.

He married Anne-Dorothée-Antoinette-Joséphine de Braumann, with whom he had six children:

Marie-Anne-Françoise-Dorothée
Pierre-Ignace-Arnold-Marie
Catherine-Elisabeth-Henriette-Hubertine
Madeleine-Antoinette-Ulrique-Eugénie
Antoinette-Caroline-Joséphine-Catherine
Gaspar-Joseph-Eugène-Louis

He was a knight of the Austrian Order of Leopold and was awarded the Prussian Red Eagle Order, third class.

From 1817 to 1859 he was Mayor of Neutral Moresnet.

External links
 Neutral-Moresnet at Kelmis

References

1774 births
1863 deaths
People from Plombières
De Lasaulx, Arnold Timothee
Neutral Moresnet